Senator Burt may refer to:

Marvin Burt (1905–1983), Illinois State Senate
Wellington R. Burt (1831–1919), Michigan State Senate
William Burt (politician) (fl. 2010s), New Mexico State Senate